Marc Alexander Thiessen (born January 13, 1967) is an American conservative author, political appointee, and weekly columnist for The Washington Post. Thiessen served as a speechwriter for President George W. Bush from 2007 to 2009 and Secretary of Defense Donald Rumsfeld from 2001 to 2006.  

In 2010, he published the book Courting Disaster: How the C.I.A. Kept America Safe and How Barack Obama Is Inviting the Next Attack, which defended the use of the torture technique waterboarding during the George W. Bush administration, arguing that it was not torture. He also wrote that the Obama administration's rejection of torture might lead to American deaths.

Early life and education
Thiessen was born on January 13, 1967. He grew up on the Upper East Side in Manhattan, where both his parents were doctors and "left-of-center liberal Democrat types". His mother grew up in Poland and fought as a teenager in the Warsaw Uprising, a military struggle in which his grandfather died.

Thiessen is a graduate of the Taft School (1985), a private prep school in Watertown, Connecticut. He earned a Bachelor of Arts degree from Vassar College in 1989 and completed graduate studies at the Naval War College.

Career

After graduating from college, Thiessen moved to Washington, D.C., where he has worked for many years, starting at the lobbying firm Black, Manafort, Stone and Kelly (BMSK) from 1989 to 1993. BMSK is notable as two of the founders and name partners, Paul Manafort and Roger Stone, became convicted felons during the Trump administration (Manafort was convicted of 8 charges and prosecuted on 10 more to which he admitted guilt, and was later charged with dozens more in NY; Stone was convicted for 7 felonies) but both were pardoned by Trump, one of the firm's first clients. 

From 1995 to 2001, he served on Capitol Hill as spokesman and senior policy advisor to Senate Foreign Relations Committee Chairman Jesse Helms (R-NC).

He joined the George W. Bush administration as Chief Speechwriter for Donald Rumsfeld in 2001, and later to Bush's speechwriting team in 2004. In February 2008, he became chief speechwriter when William McGurn resigned.

In March 2009, Thiessen and Peter Schweizer founded the communications firm, Oval Office Writers LLC.

Since 2009, Thiessen has been a visiting fellow at the Hoover Institution. He is also a resident fellow at the American Enterprise Institute.

Thiessen has been a columnist for The Washington Post since March 2010. In his columns, he has criticized the Obama administration and advocated against the Iran nuclear deal. In 2020, he defended President Donald Trump’s decision to assassinate Iranian General Qasem Soleimani, saying it was "defensive, preemptive, and lawful."

He also serves as a Fox News commentator.

Book
Thiessen's first book, Courting Disaster: How the CIA Kept America Safe and How Barack Obama Is Inviting the Next Attack, was published by Regnery Publishing in January 2010. In the book he argued that the CIA's systematic use of enhanced interrogation techniques was effective, lawful, and moral. The book was endorsed by the former Vice President Dick Cheney, former Secretary of Defense Donald Rumsfeld, and former Attorney General Michael Mukasey. It reached the No. 9 spot on the New York Times Best Sellers list for hardcover nonfiction in February 2010.

Jane Mayer, author of The Dark Side, heavily criticized Courting Disaster; in a book review in the New Yorker, Mayer wrote that Thiessen's book was "based on a series of slipshod premises" and was "better at conveying fear than at relaying the facts." In the book, Thiessen writes, "In the decade before the C.I.A. began interrogating captured terrorists, Al-Qaeda launched repeated attacks against America. In the eight years since the C.I.A. began interrogating captured terrorists, Al-Qaeda has not succeeded in launching one single attack on the homeland or American interests abroad." Mayer wrote, "This is not exactly a textbook demonstration of causality", and noted that Thiessen's claim was false anyway; Al-Qaeda had launched numerous attacks targeting Americans since the start of the torture program. Mayer ended her review with a criticism of the Obama administration for not convening a commission on the Bush administration's torture, thus allowing Thiessen and other proponents of torture to whitewash history. 

The 6,700-page Senate Intelligence Committee report on CIA torture found that the CIA's enhanced interrogation program was not an effective method of gathering intelligence. The report was approved with seven Democrats, one Independent, and one Republican voting in favor, and six Republicans voting against.

A pseudonymous former military interrogator and author of How to Break a Terrorist, writing for Slate, characterized Thiessen's book as "a literary defense of war criminals" and criticized Thiessen for relying solely on the opinions of CIA interrogators.

Personal life
Thiessen lives in Alexandria, Virginia, with his wife Pamela, who is the Staff Director of the United States Senate Republican Policy Committee. They have four children. He is Catholic.

References

External links

 Op-eds for The Washington Post
 Blog posts at The Washington Post's website
 

1967 births
Living people
American speechwriters
American foreign policy writers
American male non-fiction writers
George W. Bush administration personnel
The Washington Post people
American columnists
Writers from Alexandria, Virginia
People from the Upper East Side
Vassar College alumni
Naval War College alumni
American people of Polish descent
American Roman Catholics
White House Directors of Speechwriting
Catholics from Virginia
Catholics from New York (state)